Upinder Kaur Ahluwalia is an Indian politician. She is the first woman mayor of Panchkula, part of Chandigarh Tricity.

Career
She won the election for Mayor of Panchkula in 2013 for Indian National Congress. She was elected in 2013 MC elections for Mayor with the support of 12 members. In 2013 when state government was of her party, Panchkula saw progress in her early tenure, but after the opposition took the majority in 2014 elections, a lack of funds by BJP-led Government caused all work to end.

The High Court refused the petition of dissolving of Municipal Corporation after all work was stopped due to lack of funds, by stating works such as road reconstruction, food and others managed were to be done by MCP.

References

Year of birth missing (living people)
Living people
Mayors of places in Haryana
Women mayors of places in Haryana
Indian National Congress politicians from Haryana
21st-century Indian politicians
21st-century Indian women politicians
Ahluwalia